John Beach is a beach on the west side of the entrance to Walker Bay on the south coast of Livingston Island, in the South Shetland Islands.

The beach was roughly charted and named "Black Point" by Robert Fildes in 1820–22. As there was already a Black Point on Livingston Island, this name was rejected and a new one substituted by the UK Antarctic Place-Names Committee in 1958. John Beach is named after the brig John (Captain John Walker) of London, which was sealing in the South Shetland Islands in 1820–21 and 1821–22.

Map
 L.L. Ivanov et al. Antarctica: Livingston Island and Greenwich Island, South Shetland Islands. Scale 1:100000 topographic map. Sofia: Antarctic Place-names Commission of Bulgaria, 2005.

References

Beaches of Livingston Island